Cosmocampus is a genus of pipefishes.

Species
There are currently 14 recognized species in this genus:
 Cosmocampus albirostris (Kaup, 1856) (Whitenose pipefish)
 Cosmocampus arctus (O. P. Jenkins & Evermann, 1889) (Snubnose pipefish)
 Cosmocampus balli (Fowler, 1925) (Ball's pipefish)
 Cosmocampus banneri (Herald & J. E. Randall, 1972) (Roughridge pipefish)
 Cosmocampus brachycephalus (Poey, 1868) (Crested pipefish)
 Cosmocampus coccineus (Herald, 1940)
 Cosmocampus darrosanus (C. E. Dawson & J. E. Randall, 1975) (D'Arros pipefish)
 Cosmocampus elucens (Poey, 1868) (Shortfin pipefish)
 Cosmocampus heraldi (Fritzsche, 1980)
 Cosmocampus hildebrandi (Herald, 1965) (Dwarf pipefish)
 Cosmocampus howensis (Whitley, 1948) (Lord Howe pipefish)
 Cosmocampus investigatoris (Hora, 1926)
 Cosmocampus maxweberi (Whitley, 1933) (Max Weber's pipefish)
 Cosmocampus profundus (Herald, 1965) (Deepwater pipefish)
 Cosmocampus retropinnis C. E. Dawson, 1982

References

 
Ray-finned fish genera
Taxa named by Charles Eric Dawson